The following is a list of civil wars, fought between organized groups within the same state or country. The terms "intrastate war", "internecine war" and "domestic war" are often used interchangeably with "civil war", but "internecine war" can be used in a wider meaning, referring to any conflict within a single state, regardless of the participation of civil forces. Thus, any war of succession is by definition an internecine war, but not necessarily a civil war.

In modern geopolitics since 1945, "civil war" is also used in a loose sense to refer to any large scale military conflict within a single country (i.e. used as a strict synonym of the generic term "internecine war"),  creating terminological overlap with insurgencies or coups d'état.

Terminology
The Latin term bellum civile was used to describe wars within a single community beginning around 60 A.D. The term is an alternative title for the work sometimes called Pharsalia by Lucan (Marcus Annaeus Lucanus) about the Roman civil wars that began in the last third of the second century BC. The term civilis here had the very specific meaning of 'Roman citizen'.

Since the 17th century, the term has also been applied retroactively to other historical conflicts where at least one side claims to represent the country's civil society (rather than a feudal dynasty or an imperial power).

Past civil wars

Ancient and early medieval (before 1000)

This is a list of intrastate armed conflicts that fulfill the definition set by this article: civil. Note that some conflicts lack both an article or citation. Without citation, they have not been guaranteed to have happened.

First Intermediate Period of Egypt, Second Intermediate Period of Egypt and Third Intermediate Period of Egypt are periods of political disunity in Ancient Egypt's history and series of civil wars between the governors of the nomes broke throughout the country.
Roman civil wars (a list of numerous civil wars in the late Roman Republic and in the Roman Empire, between 100 BC and AD 400)
First Fitna, 656–661, the first Islamic "civil war" between Ali and the Umayyads
Second Fitna, c. 680/683 – c. 685/692, the second Islamic "civil war" between the Umayyads and Ibn al-Zubayr
Twenty Years' Anarchy, 695–717, prolonged period of internal instability in the Byzantine Empire
Civil War between Artabasdos and Constantine V, 741–743
Third Fitna, 744–752, including the Umayyad civil wars of 744–748 and the Abbasid Revolution
An Lushan Rebellion, December 16, 755 – February 17, 763
Fourth Fitna, 809–827, including the Abbasid civil wars and other regional conflicts
Anarchy of the 12 Warlords, 944–968

Medieval (1000–1600)
Fitna of al-Andalus, 1009–1031
Civil war era in Norway, 1130–1240
Danish Civil Wars, 1131–1157
The Anarchy, 1135–1153
Revolt of 1173–1174 
Civil war in the crusader Kingdom of Jerusalem between King Baldwin III and dowager Queen Melisende (1152–1153)
First Barons' War, 1215–1217
Age of the Sturlungs, 1220 – 1262/64
Second Barons' War, 1264–1267
Hungarian Civil War, 1264–1265
Civil War of Livonia between Livonian Order and the city of Riga and the Archbishopric of Riga, 1297–1330.
Despenser War, 1321–1322
Invasion of England, 1326. Continuation of the Despenser War.
Byzantine civil war of 1321–1328
Byzantine civil war of 1341–1347
Byzantine civil war of 1352–1357
Castilian Civil War, 1366–1369
Byzantine civil war of 1373–1379
Welsh Revolt, 1400–1415
Ottoman Interregnum, 1402–1413
Armagnac–Burgundian Civil War, 1407–1435
Hussite Wars, 1420–1434
Great Feudal War in Russia, 1425–1453
Wars of the Roses, 1455–1485
Catalan Civil War (1462–1472)
Ōnin War, 1467–1477
Sengoku period, 1467–1615
War of the Castilian Succession, 1475–1479
Popular revolts in late-medieval Europe
German Peasants' War, 1524–1525
Civil War in Kazakh Khanate, 1522–1538
Inca Civil War, 1529–1532
Count's Feud, 1534–1536
French Wars of Religion, 1562–1598
Marian civil war, 1568–1573
War against Sigismund, 1598–1599

Early modern (1600–1800)
Civil War Era in Vietnam, 1533–1789 
Lê–Mạc Dynasties War, 1533–1677
Trịnh–Nguyễn Lords War, 1627–1772; 1774–1775
Tây Sơn wars, 1771–1802
Zebrzydowski rebellion, 1606–1609
Shimabara Rebellion, 1637–1638
Wars of the Three Kingdoms, 1639–1651 involved a number of civil wars:
Irish Confederate Wars, some parts of which were a civil war.
Scotland in the Wars of the Three Kingdoms, to some extent a civil war, 1644–1652
English Civil War, 1642–1651
First English Civil War, 1642–1646
Second English Civil War, 1648–1649
Third English Civil War, 1650–1651
Acadian Civil War, 1640–1645
The Fronde, 1648–1653
The Ruin, 1659–1686
Brunei Civil War, 1660s—1673
Lubomirski's rebellion, 1665–1666
Monmouth Rebellion, May–July 1685
Glorious Revolution, 1688–1689
War of the Spanish Succession, 1701–1714
Choctaw Civil War, 1747–1750
Pugachev's Rebellion, 1773–1775 
 War in the Vendée, 1793–1804; between Royalist and Republican forces, part of the French Revolutionary Wars
Afghan Civil War, 1793–1809

Modern (1800–1945)
Gutiérrez–Magee Expedition, 1812–1813
Argentine Civil Wars, 1814–1880
Ndwandwe–Zulu War, 1817–1819
Long Expedition, 1819, 1821
Greek Civil Wars, 1823–1825
Ochomogo War, 1823
Fredonian Rebellion, 1826–1827
Liberal Wars, 1828–1834
Chilean Civil War, 1829–1830
Revolutions of 1830; numerous European countries, 1830
Egyptian–Ottoman War (1831–1833)
Carlist Wars, 1833–1839, 1846–1849, and 1872–1876
Texas Revolution 1835–1836
Ragamuffin War, 1835–1845
League War, 1835
Chimayó Rebellion, 1837
Córdova Rebellion, 1838
Uruguayan Civil War, 1839–1851
War of the Supremes, 1839–1842
Rio Grande Rebellion, 1840
Yucatán Rebellion, 1841–1848
 The New Zealand Wars, 1845 - 1872 
Bear Flag Revolt, 1846
Sonderbund War, November 1847
Revolutions of 1848; numerous European countries, 1848–1849
Revolution of 1851
Taiping Rebellion, 1851–1863
Bleeding Kansas, 1854–1858
Indian Rebellion of 1857
Utah War, 1857–1858
War of Reform, 1857–1861
Federal War, 1859–1863
American Civil War, 1861–1865
Afghan Civil War, 1863–1869
Austro-Prussian War, 1866
Klang War; also known as Selangor Civil War, 1867–1874
Boshin War, 1868–1869
Satsuma Rebellion, 1877
Jementah Civil War, 1878
Afghan Civil War, 1880–1881
 The North-West Rebellion, 1885
Revolution of the Park, 1890
Chilean Civil War, 1891
Argentine Revolution of 1893, 1893
War of Canudos, 1896–1897
Banana Wars, 1898–1934
Federal Revolution, 1899
Thousand Days' War, 1899–1902
Liberating Revolution (Venezuela), 1901–1903
Argentine Revolution of 1905, 1905
Persian Constitutional Revolution, 1905–1911, Civil War considered to begin after 1908
Mexican Revolution, 1910–1920
Warlord Era; period of civil wars between regional, provincial, and private armies in China, 1912–1928
Russian Civil War, 1917–1923 
Iraqi–Kurdish conflict, 1918–2003
Finnish Civil War, 1918
Ukrainian Civil War, 1917–1921
German Revolution, 1918–1919
Revolts during the Turkish War of Independence, includes conflict between the Imperial Ottoman Government and the Turkish National Movement, 1919–1922
Irish Civil War, 1922–1923
Paraguayan Civil War, 1922–1923
Nicaraguan Civil War, 1926–1927
Cristero War, 1926–1929
Chinese Civil War, 1927–1937, 1945–1949 (de facto)
Afghan Civil War, 1928–1929
Brazilian Civil War, 1932
Austrian Civil War, February 1934
Spanish Civil War, 1936–1939
Ukrainian Insurgent Army insurgency, 1943–1956
Italian Civil War during WWII 1943–1945

Since 1945

Iran crisis of 1946, 1945–1946
Greek Civil War, 1946–1949
Paraguayan Civil War, 1947
Civil War in Mandatory Palestine, 1947–1948
Costa Rican civil war, 1948
1948 Arab–Israeli War, 1948
Yeosu–Suncheon rebellion, 1948
Jeju uprising, 1948
La Violencia, 1948–1958
Malayan Emergency, 1948–1960
Internal conflict in Myanmar, ongoing since 1948
Revolución Libertadora, 1955
Cuban Revolution, 1953–1959
Laotian Civil War, 1953–1975
First Sudanese Civil War, 1955–1972
Congo Crisis, 1960–1966
Guatemalan Civil War, 1960–1996
North Yemen Civil War 1962–1970
Communist insurgency in Sarawak, 1962–1990
Nicaraguan Civil War, 1962–1990
Dominican Civil War, 1965
Rhodesian Bush War, 1965–1980
Communist insurgency in Thailand, 1965–1983
Cambodian Civil War, 1967–1975
Nigerian Civil War, 1967–1970
Communist insurgency in Malaysia, 1968–1989
Bangladesh Liberation War, 1971
Ethiopian Civil War, 1974–1991
Lebanese Civil War, 1975–1990
Mozambican Civil War, 1975–1992
Angolan Civil War, 1975–2002
Insurgency in Aceh, 1976–2005
Soviet–Afghan War, part of / also called Afghanistan conflict (1978–present), December 24, 1979 – February 15, 1989 (Soviet–Afghan War lasted over nine years from 1979 to 1989 and was part of the Cold War but it was inevitable that the regime was to collapse within three to six months after the Soviet withdrawal)
Salvadoran Civil War, 1979–1992
Second Sudanese Civil War, 1983–2005
Sri Lankan Civil War, 1983–2009
South Yemen Civil War, 1986
Afghan Civil War (1989–1992), February 15, 1989 – April 30, 1992. The continuing part of the civil war where the Soviet Union withdrew from Afghanistan, leaving the Afghan communist government to fend for itself against the Mujahideen months later part of / also called Afghanistan conflict (1978–present)
First Liberian Civil War, 1989–1996
Rwandan Civil War, 1990–1994
Casamance conflict, 1990–2006
Georgian Civil War, 1991–1993
Iraqi uprisings, 1991 
Sierra Leone Civil War, 1991–2002
Algerian Civil War, 1991–2002
Tajikistani Civil War, 1992–1997
Afghan Civil War (1992–1996), April 30, 1992 – September 27, 1996. When the Afghan communist government falls to the Mujahideen there was a rise in different kinds of ideology, power-sharing, Belligerents and violent fighting continue to escalate part of / also called Afghanistan conflict (1978–present)
Burundian Civil War, 1993–2005
First Yemeni Civil War, 1994
Iraqi Kurdish Civil War, 1994–1997
Afghan Civil War (1996–2001), September 27, 1996 – October 7, 2001. In 1996 the Taliban captured the Afghan capital Kabul and established the Islamic Emirate of Afghanistan part of / also called Afghanistan conflict (1978–present)
First Congo War, 1996–1997
Clashes in Cambodia, 1997
Nepalese Civil War, 1996–2006
Albanian Civil War, 1997
Republic of the Congo Civil War, 1997–1999
Guinea-Bissau Civil War, 1998–1999
Second Congo War, 1998–2003
Kosovo War (1998–1999)
Second Liberian Civil War, 1999–2003
First Ivorian Civil War, 2002–2007 
Second Chadian Civil War, 2005-2010
Iraqi Civil War, 2006–2008
First Libyan Civil War, 2011
Second Ivorian Civil War, 2011
South Sudanese Civil War, 2013-2020
Second Libyan Civil War, 2014–2020
Tigray War, 2020–2022

Ongoing civil wars
The following civil wars are ongoing as of December 2022. Only ongoing conflicts which meet the definition of a civil war are listed. See List of ongoing armed conflicts and lists of active separatist movements for lists with a wider scope.

 , Internal conflict in Myanmar, since 1948
 , Colombian conflict, since 1964
 , Somali Civil War, since 1978
 , Afghanistan conflict, since 1978
 , Allied Democratic Forces insurgency, since 1996; Ituri conflict, since 1999; Kivu conflict, since 2004
 , Communal conflicts in Nigeria, since 1998; Boko Haram insurgency, since 2009; Nigerian bandit conflict, since 2011
 , Insurgency in the Maghreb, since 2002
 , Iraq conflict, since 2003
 , War in Darfur, since 2003; Sudanese nomadic conflicts, since 2008
 , Mexican Drug War, since 2006
 , Syrian civil war, since 2011
 , Islamist insurgency in the Sahel, since 2011
 , Yemeni civil war, since 2014

See also
 List of ongoing armed conflicts
 List of coups and coup attempts
 List of revolutions and rebellions
 List of wars of independence
 List of Roman civil wars and revolts
 List of English civil wars
 Exclusive mandate

References

Civil wars